João Costa Gomes (born 29 July 1996) is a Portuguese footballer who plays for U.D. Leiria as a defender.

Football career
On 29 July 2018, Gomes made his professional debut with Estoril Praia in a 2018–19 Taça da Liga match against Farense.

References

External links

1996 births
Living people
Portuguese footballers
Association football defenders
Segunda Divisão players
C.D. Mafra players
G.D. Estoril Praia players
U.D. Leiria players
Footballers from Lisbon